Amy Lansky is an American academic. She was the director of the Office of National AIDS Policy.

Education 
Lansky earned a bachelor's degree in political science from Swarthmore College. She holds doctoral and master's degrees in public health from the University of North Carolina at Chapel Hill.

Career 
Lansky served as the Deputy Director for Surveillance, Epidemiology, and Laboratory Science in Centers for Disease Control and Prevention’s Division of HIV/AIDS Prevention where she provided scientific direction and oversight for HIV surveillance activities, epidemiologic studies and clinical trials, and laboratory research. Lansky was a Senior Policy Advisor to the Office of National Drug Control Policy and Office of National AIDS Policy where she ensured coordination on issues of substance abuse and HIV infection, and co-authored the National HIV/AIDS Strategy: Updated to 2020. She later became the director of the Office of National AIDS Policy.

References

External links
 

Living people
Year of birth missing (living people)
HIV/AIDS researchers
Swarthmore College alumni
UNC Gillings School of Global Public Health alumni
Obama administration personnel
20th-century African-American women
20th-century African-American people
21st-century American women
Centers for Disease Control and Prevention people